Qusha Bolagh-e Sofla (also Romanized as Qūshā Bolāgh-e Soflá and Qowshā Bolāgh-e Soflá; also known as Qūshā Bolāgh-e Pā’īn) is a village in Baba Jik Rural District, in the Central District of Chaldoran County, West Azerbaijan Province, Iran. At the 2006 census, its population was 185, in 32 families.

References 

Populated places in Chaldoran County